Mitch White (born 10 April 1996) is a former professional Australian rules footballer who played for the Melbourne Football Club in the Australian Football League (AFL). He entered top-level football early when he played as a bottom-aged player for the Dandenong Stingrays in the TAC Cup in 2013, the next season saw him win the club best and fairest. He was recruited by the Melbourne Football Club with the twentieth selection in the 2015 rookie draft and he made his AFL debut during the 2015 season. He played four matches in the AFL before he was delisted at the conclusion of the 2017 season.

Early life
White was raised in Carrum Downs, Victoria and played his junior football with the Seaford Football Club. He played for the Dandenong Stingrays in the TAC Cup as a bottom-aged player in 2013, playing six matches. He was selected again to play for Dandenong in 2014, playing sixteen matches and was awarded the club best and fairest.

AFL career
White was recruited by the Melbourne Football Club with their second selection and twentieth overall in the 2015 rookie draft. He made his Victorian Football League (VFL) debut for Melbourne's affiliate team, the Casey Scorpions, in round three and spent the majority of 2015 playing for Casey. He made his AFL debut in the twenty-six point win against  at Etihad Stadium in the final round of the season, in which he recorded sixteen disposals and six marks. 

The 2016 season saw White play predominately in the VFL before he was upgraded to the senior list in July. He played his first AFL match of the year in the thirty-two point win against  at TIO Stadium in round sixteen, in which he recorded twenty disposals and received praise from then-Melbourne coach, Paul Roos. He retained his spot the next week in the thirty-six point loss against  at Etihad Stadium, before being omitted for the round eighteen match against  at Domain Stadium.

An ankle injury forced White to miss the entire 2017 JLT Community Series and VFL practice matches, before playing his first match of the year in the round two VFL match against . After "terrific VFL form" according to senior coach, Simon Goodwin, he played in his first AFL match for the season in the round fifteen match against  at the Melbourne Cricket Ground.
It was ultimately his only AFL match for the season and after four matches in three seasons with Melbourne, he was delisted in September.

Statistics
 Statistics are correct to the end of the 2017 season

|- style="background-color: #EAEAEA"
! scope="row" style="text-align:center" | 2015
|
| 41 || 1 || 0 || 0 || 9 || 7 || 16 || 6 || 1 || 0.0 || 0.0 || 9.0 || 7.0 || 16.0 || 6.0 || 1.0
|-
! scope="row" style="text-align:center" | 2016
|
| 41 || 2 || 0 || 0 || 9 || 19 || 28 || 7 || 6 || 0.0 || 0.0 || 4.5 || 9.5 || 14.0 || 3.5 || 3.0
|- style="background-color: #EAEAEA"
! scope="row" style="text-align:center" | 2017
|
| 41 || 1 || 0 || 0 || 5 || 6 || 11 || 4 || 1 || 0.0 || 0.0 || 5.0 || 6.0 || 11.0 || 4.0 || 1.0
|- class="sortbottom"
! colspan=3| Career
! 4
! 0
! 0
! 23
! 32
! 55
! 17
! 8
! 0.0
! 0.0
! 5.8
! 8.0
! 13.8
! 4.3
! 2.0
|}

References

External links

Mitch White's profile from Demonwiki

1996 births
Living people
Melbourne Football Club players
Dandenong Stingrays players
Casey Demons players
Australian rules footballers from Victoria (Australia)
People from the City of Frankston